
Gmina Ustrzyki Dolne is an urban-rural gmina (administrative district) in Bieszczady County, Subcarpathian Voivodeship, in south-eastern Poland.

The gmina contains part of the protected area called Słonne Mountains Landscape Park.

Villages
Apart from the town of Ustrzyki Dolne, Gmina Ustrzyki Dolne contains the villages and settlements of Arłamów, Bandrów Narodowy, Brelików, Brzegi Dolne, Dźwiniacz Dolny, Grąziowa, Hoszów, Hoszowczyk, Jałowe, Jamna Dolna, Jamna Górna, Jureczkowa, Krościenko, Kwaszenina, Leszczowate, Liskowate, Łobozew Dolny, Łobozew Górny, Łodyna, Moczary, Nowosielce Kozickie, Ropienka, Równia, Serednica, Stańkowa, Teleśnica Oszwarowa, Trójca, Trzcianiec, Ustjanowa Dolna, Ustjanowa Górna, Wojtkowa, Wojtkówka, Wola Romanowa, Zadwórze and Zawadka.

Neighbouring gminas
Gmina Ustrzyki Dolne is bordered by the gminas of Bircza, Czarna, Fredropol, Olszanica and Solina.

References
Polish official population figures 2006

Ustrzyki Dolne
Bieszczady County